The 1993–94 Pittsburgh Panthers men's basketball team represented the University of Pittsburgh in the 1993–94 NCAA Division I men's basketball season. Led by head coach Paul Evans, the Panthers finished with a record of 13–14.

References

Pittsburgh Panthers men's basketball seasons
Pittsburgh
Pittsburgh Pan
Pittsburgh Pan